The Gashlycrumb Tinies: or, After the Outing is an alphabet book written by Edward Gorey that was first published in 1963 as the first of a collection of short stories called The Vinegar Works, the eleventh work by Gorey. The book tells the tale of 26 children (each representing a letter of the alphabet) and their untimely deaths. It is one of Edward Gorey's best-known books and is the most notorious amongst his roughly half-dozen mock alphabets. It has been described as a "sarcastic rebellion against a view of childhood that is sunny, idyllic, and instructive". The morbid humor of the book comes in part from the mundane ways in which the children in the story die, such as falling down the stairs or choking on a peach. Far from illustrating the dramatic and fantastical childhood nightmares, these scenarios instead poke fun at the banal paranoias that come as a part of parenting.

Gorey has stated the book to be inspired by “those 19th century cautionary tales, I guess, though my book is punishment without misbehavior.”

Description 

The book, an abecedarium, tells of the deaths of twenty-six children, and is told in thirteen rhyming dactylic couplets, accompanied by the author's distinctive black-and-white illustrations. The book incorporates several elements from alphabet books (such as having each child in the book named after a letter in the English alphabet, and having each entry illustrated), and appends a cause of death for each child, such as being set on fire, being run over by a train or being attacked by wild animals.

See also 
 Cautionary Tales for Children
 A Series of Unfortunate Events

References

External links 
 Worldcat listing for The Gashlycrumb Tinies

1963 children's books
Alphabet books
American picture books
Black comedy books
Books by Edward Gorey